Seikh Sadi Khan (born 1950) is a Bangladeshi music director. He has composed for 29 films. The following is a list of films he scored:

1970s

1980s

1990s

2000s

2010s

2020s

Year unknown

Background score only

Non-film albums

As lyricist

References

Sources
 

Discographies of Bangladeshi artists